Wildberg is a town in the district of Calw in Baden-Württemberg, Germany.

History
Wildberg was founded by County of Hohenberg around 1281 at the foot of a castle built around 1200 by the County Palatine of Tübingen. Over the course of the 14th century, Wildberg became a possession of the Electoral Palatinate, who sold it and the towns of Schönbronn, Sulz am Eck, and Gültlingen to the County of Württemberg in 1440. The latter town would not be fully controlled by Württemberg until 1445, when it purchased the properties of other local nobles. After World War II, Effringen, Gültlingen and Sulz am Eck established new residential areas but it was not until the 1970s that Wildberg also began growing. In 1971, Schönbronn merged into Wildberg and was followed four years later by Effringen, Gültlingen and Sulz am Eck. Growth slows in Gültlingen, Schönbronn, and Sulz am Eck, but continued in Wildberg into the 1990s.

Geography
The township (Stadt) of Wildberg is situated on the eastern edge of the district of Calw, in the German state of Baden-Württemberg, and lies along the border with the district of Böblingen to the east. Elevation above sea level in the municipal area ranges from a high of  Normalnull (NN) to a low of  NN.

Politics
Wildberg has five boroughs (Ortsteile) – Effringen, Gültlingen, Schönbronn, Sulz am Eck, and Wildberg – and nine villages: Haselstaller Höfe, Käpfleshöfe, Kengelhöfe, Lerchenberg, Obere Papiermühle, Reuthin, Trölleshof, Untere Papiermühle, and Untere Sägmühle. Also located in the municipal area are the minor administrative area of Ziegelhütte and the abandoned villages of Berfeldingen, Gaisburg, and Weiler.

Coat of arms
The municipal coat of arms of Wildberg is divided party per fess into an upper, white half containing a black , and a lower, red half containing a white "W". The fields and the overall red-white tincture are taken from the arms of the Counts of Hohenberg and first began appearing in town seals in 1297. The "W" became a local motif some time before 1660, first appearing in local seals in 1593. The stag antler is also a long-lived local motif and was first used around 1612. The municipal coat of arms was approved on 26 January 1976 by the Federal Ministry of the Interior and a municipal flag issued to Wildberg.

Transportation

See also
 117506 Wildberg

References

External links

  (in German)

Calw (district)